The Arakan Mountains, natively referred as Rakhine Yoma and technically known as the Southern Indo-Burman Range, are a mountain range in western Myanmar, between the coast of Rakhine State and the Central Myanmar Basin, in which flows the Irrawaddy River. It is the most prominent of a series of parallel ridges that arc through Assam, Nagaland, Manipur, Mizoram and Myanmar.

The Arakan Mountains run from Cape Negrais in the south in to Manipur, India in the north. They include the Naga Hills, the Chin Hills, and the Patkai range which includes the Lushai Hills. The mountain chain is submerged in the Bay of Bengal for a long stretch and emerges again in the form of the Andaman and Nicobar Islands.

Etymology
The word Arakan is derived from the Sanskrit word Rakshasa (राक्षस), a term used to refer to the inhabitants of the region.

Geology and formation
The Arakan Mountains and the parallel arcs to the west and east were formed by compression as the Indian Plate collided with the Eurasian Plate approximately along the boundary between India and Myanmar which produced the Naga-Patkai foldbelt.

High points
The Arakan Mountain Range is over 600 miles (950 km) long, with about 250 miles (400 km) of actual mountains.

Infrastructure
The Arakan Mountains are crossed by a road between Ngape and Minbu and by an all-weather road from Taungup to Pyay on the Irrawaddy.

History
The Arakan Mountains divide the Rakhine coast from the rest of Myanmar, and thus have acted as a barrier between the peoples of central Myanmar and those of the Indian subcontinent. This played a role in fostering the separate development of the Rakhine people, both linguistically and culturally, from the Burmese. The Arakan Mountains also served as a barrier inhibiting Burmese invasions, and allowing Arakan to develop as a separate political entity. Thus the coastal cities, such as Mrauk U and Waithali, formed the core of Arakan civilization.

There were fierce battles in these mountains between January 1943 and March 1944 during the Japanese occupation of Burma. The Japanese 33rd and 55th Divisions faced the British military on the coastal side of the range. The British forces won.

Ecology
They include the Chin Hills-Arakan Yoma montane forests ecoregion which is home to an elephant population and also the critically endangered Arakan forest turtle which was considered extinct until its rediscovery in 1994.

Notes

External links
 Burma - Geography
 Google Books, The Physical Geography of Southeast Asia

Mountain ranges of Myanmar